Magic Symphony is the first single from the Blue System's third studio album, Twilight. It was published in 1989 by Hanseatic M.V. and was distributed by BMG. The lyrics, music, arrangements and productions belongs to Dieter Bohlen, co-production belongs to Luis Rodriguez.

Track listing 
 12" Maxi
 Magic Symphony (Long Version) - 5:31
 Magic Symphony (Radio Version) - 3:35
 Magic Symphony (Instrumental) - 3:35
7" Single
 Magic Symphony - 3:35
 Magic Symphony (Instrumental) - 3:35

Charts 

Blue System songs
1989 songs
1989 singles
1990 singles
Songs written by Dieter Bohlen
Song recordings produced by Dieter Bohlen
Ariola Records singles
Articles containing video clips